Rohda Raalte is a football club from Raalte, Netherlands. Rohda Raalte plays in the 2017–18 Sunday Eerste Klasse E.

The club had its glory years from 1978 to 1988 when it ended 10 years in a row in the top four of the Hoofdklasse, at that time the highest amateur league. In 1979 it even became overall amateur champions.

References

External links
 Official site

 
Football clubs in the Netherlands
Football clubs in Raalte
Association football clubs established in 1929
1929 establishments in the Netherlands